Tudur ap Gruffudd (1365-1405), also known as Tudor de Glendore or Tudor Glendower, was the Lord of Gwyddelwern, a junior title of the Princely house of Powys Fadog, and was the younger brother of Owain Glyndŵr, the Welsh rebel leader crowned Prince of Wales (anglicized by William Shakespeare as 'Owen Glendower' in his play Henry IV). His father was Gruffydd Fychan II, the hereditary Prince of Powys Fadog and previous Lord of Gwyddelwern. Along with his brother, Owain Glyndŵr, Tudur was a member of the Royal House of Mathrafal.

History

As a Commander and leader of the army, he joined the Glyndŵr Rising, his brother's rebellion, fighting with him, his nephews and extended family such as the Tudors of Penmynydd, Sir Edmund Mortimer of the House of Mortimer, and Sir Henry 'Hotspur' Percy of the House of Percy, for the independence of Wales and the conquest of England. These last two, and Owain, signed together the Tripartite Indenture, an agreement that would split England and Wales in three separate Kingdoms between themselves after removing from power the King of England, Henry IV. A few months later, Tudur commanded an army with his nephew during the rebellions and fought against Prince Henry, known through Shakespeare as Prince Hal, the future King Henry V of England and winner of the Battle of Agincourt. He later suffered a colossal defeat at the Battle of Pwll Melyn in Wales, and was killed, while his nephew would be captured and sent to the Tower of London, where he would become a prisoner with the young King James I of Scotland. His head was publicly exhibited across London. His other nephews and cousins would also be mercilessly put to death or taken as prisoners by the House of Lancaster.

Among Tudur's cousins, who fought with him during the Welsh Revolt, were Gwilym ap Tudur and Rhys ap Tudur, who famously seized Conway Castle, and Maredudd ap Tudur, the father of Sir Owen Tudor, of the Royal House of Tudor. Having lost the war but being spared, Maredudd's son, Sir Owen, fled Wales to establish himself in England, and anglicized his name from Tudur to Tudor. He later became the father of Jasper Tudor, Duke of Bedford and Edmund Tudor, 1st Earl of Richmond, and thus became the grandfather of King Henry VII of England, founder of the Tudor Dynasty, and was married to the Queen Catherine de Valois, daughter of King Charles VI of France, of the Royal House of Valois. Having married the previous wife of King Henry V of England, of which his family and cousins were fighting against during the rebellions, such as Tudur and Owain, he ended up becoming the stepfather of his son, King Henry VI of England, of the House of Lancaster, while his own sons, Jasper Tudor and Edmund Tudor, ended up being his half-brothers. This would later be influential for the cousins of Tudur, the remaining Tudors of Penmynydd, to gain back some of their influence in Wales, by having their cousins on the throne of England.

Ancestry

Through his mother, Elen Ferch Tomos, wife of Prince Gruffudd Fychan II, Tudur was a descendant of the Prince of Wales, Llywelyn ap Gruffudd (died 1282), and of his wife, Princess Eleanor de Montfort. Llywelyn was the grandson of Prince Llywelyn the Great, the grandfather of Isabella of Mar, wife of Robert the Bruce, King of Scotland, and grandmother of Robert II, founder of the Royal House of Stuart. Eleanor, on her side, was the granddaughter of King John of England of the Royal House of Plantagenet, and of his wife, Queen Isabelle of Angouleme, the granddaughter of King Louis VI of France of the Royal House of France, and niece of Peter of Courtenay, Emperor of Constantinople. King John had, as his brother, the famous Richard the Lionheart, while his children were respectively Richard, King of the Romans, Henry, King of England, Joan, Queen of Scotland, as well as Isabella, Holy Roman Empress, Queen of Italy and Queen of Germany. Through the Princes of Deheubarth, such as Lord Rhys, Tudur was a descendant of the Royal House of Aberffraw as well. During the war of independence, some of these Royal lineages were used to gain support for his family and his brother, Owain, the Prince of Wales, to legitimize their claim to the throne of Wales, as well as gaining support from the Kingdom of France, through the House of Valois.

Tudor de Glendore

Tudur was also recorded to be present as a witness, under the name Tudor de Glendore, along with his brother Owain Glyndŵr, Prince John of Gaunt, Duke of Lancaster, and many others, at the Scrope v Grosvenor trial of 1389, a High Court of Chivalry case that was presided by the Constable of England, Prince Thomas of Woodstock, Duke of Gloucester.

Legacy

In terms of legacy, despite having lost the war of independence of Wales, the Glyndŵr Rising gave rise to the Royal House of Tudor, the first Welsh Kings of England. This historic period would later be immortalized in William Shakespeare's plays, Henry IV, Part 1 and Henry IV, Part 2, through the character of Tudur's brother, Owen Glendower, and much later, on the Flag of Wales, by having the red dragon used by Owain Glyndŵr and King Henry Tudor during their rebellions. Many poems and books were also written during this period, to glamorize the Glendowers as legendary symbols of Welsh nationalism.

Descendants

Lord Tudur ap Gruffudd married to Maud, daughter and heiress of Ieuav ab Adda, a descendant of Tudor Trevor, Lord of Hereford and Whittington. They had a daughter and sole heiress named Lowry.
She married first to Robin ab Gruffydd, Lord of Rhos, by whom she had a son named David, then secondly, to Gruffydd ab Einion, by whom she had a second son named Elissau ap Gruffudd (Ellis ap Griffith), born in 1440. He became Baron of Gwyddelwern and married Margaret, daughter of Jenkyn ap Ievan of Allt Llwyn Dragon (Plas-yn-Yale), and was a cousin of Jasper Tudor, Duke of Bedford and Edmund Tudor, 1st Earl of Richmond, members of the House of Tudor. One of Elissau's cousin and two of his grandsons served under the Tudors. Roger Puleston, son of Robert Puleston, held Denbigh Castle for Jasper Tudor during the War of the Roses, as his Deputy Constable. Roger Lloyd Yale served as Secretary to Cardinal Thomas Wolsey, the Chief minister of Henry VIII, and Thomas Yale served as Chancellor to Archbishop Edmund Grindal, the head of the Church of England for Elizabeth I. Chancellor Thomas Yale became the great-great granduncle of Governor Elihu Yale who gave his name to Yale University. The great-grandfather of Tudur, Prince Gruffudd Fychan I, was the Lord of Yale and ancestor of the Yale family.

Further reading
R. R. Davies The Revolt of Owain Glyn Dŵr (Oxford University Press, 2001)

References

Welsh rebels
1405 deaths
Year of birth uncertain
Gwyddelwern
1365 births